Álvaro Cardoso Teixeira (11 January 1965 – 9 May 2017) was a Portuguese former football player and manager who played as a defender.

Playing career
Born in Luanda, Angola, Teixeira started playing professionally with Vitória de Setúbal, joining Belenenses in the 1986–87 season. With the Belém club he won the Taça de Portugal in the 1988–89 season.

Teixeira sequently went on the play for Torreense and Lusitano de Évora ending his career with Pinhalnovense.

Coaching career
Teixeira started his coaching career in 1999, with Torreense in the 1998–99 season as a player manager. He also managed Lusitano de Évora in the 2005–06 season.

Death
Teixeira died of a chronic disease on 9 May 2019 at only 53 years of age.

Honours

Player
Belenenses
Taça de Portugal: 1988–89

References

External links
 
 

1964 births
2017 deaths
People from Luanda
Portuguese footballers
Association football defenders
Primeira Liga players
Vitória F.C. players
C.F. Os Belenenses players
F.C. Felgueiras players
S.C.U. Torreense players
Lusitano G.C. players
Portuguese football managers